Annam may refer to:

Places
 Annam, a name of Vietnam used until 1945
 Names of Vietnam
 Annam (French protectorate), a former subdivision of French Indochina, now the central region of Vietnam
 Annan (Tang protectorate), the southernmost province of Imperial China between 679–866, now northern Vietnam
 Annamite Range, a mountain range in Laos and Vietnam

Other uses
 Nachiarkoil lamp or Annam lamp, an ornate brass oil lamp made in India
 Annam (Dungeons & Dragons), a character in Dungeons & Dragons role-playing universe
 SAS Tafelberg, Danish tanker originally named Annam

See also
Anam (disambiguation)